Fritz Krombholz (born 24 March 1878, date of death unknown) was an Austrian rower. He competed in the men's coxed four event at the 1912 Summer Olympics.

References

1878 births
Year of death missing
Austrian male rowers
Olympic rowers of Austria
Rowers at the 1912 Summer Olympics
People from Teplice District